Joseph Dominick Calderazzo (February 27, 1965) is a jazz pianist and brother of musician Gene Calderazzo. He played extensively in bands led by Michael Brecker and Branford Marsalis, and has also led his own bands.

Early life
Calderazzo was born in New Rochelle, New York. He began studying classical piano at age eight. His brother, Gene, got him interested in jazz. He studied with Richard Beirach and in the 1980s continued his studies at Berklee College of Music and the Manhattan School of Music. At the same time, he was playing professionally with David Liebman and Frank Foster.

Later life and career
At a music clinic he met saxophonist Michael Brecker and became part of his quintet beginning in 1987. In 1990, he signed with Blue Note Records. Brecker produced Calderazzo's first album, In the Door, which featured Jerry Bergonzi and Branford Marsalis, his brother's roommate in Boston. They played on his second album, To Know One, which included Dave Holland and Jack DeJohnette.

Calderazzo appeared on Brecker's albums Tales from the Hudson and Two Blocks from the Edge as pianist and composer. He played keyboard in Marsalis's Buckshot LeFonque and contributed to his album Music Evolution. When pianist Kenny Kirkland died in 1998, Calderazzo assumed his place in the Branford Marsalis Quartet.
In 1999 he recorded Joey Calderazzo with John Patitucci and Jeff 'Tain' Watts. He played on Marsalis's albums Contemporary Jazz, Footsteps of Our Fathers, Romare Bearden Revealed, Eternal and on the DVD Coltrane's 'A Love Supreme' Live in Amsterdam. Calderazzo's composition "Hope" appears on Braggtown.

He was one of the first musicians to sign with Marsalis Music, owned by Branford Marsalis. Haiku, his first solo album, appeared in 2002. His album Amanacer featured singer Claudia Acuña and guitarist Romero Lubambo. In 2011, he and Marsalis formed a duo and recorded Songs of Mirth and Melancholy.

Calderazzo developed cubital tunnel syndrome in 2017, resulting in numbness in two fingers of his right hand. Following surgery and rest, he was able to return to playing as before.

Discography

As leader/co-leader

Main source:

As sideman

References 

 

American jazz pianists
American male pianists
Musicians from New Rochelle, New York
Living people
1965 births
20th-century American pianists
Jazz musicians from New York (state)
21st-century American pianists
20th-century American male musicians
21st-century American male musicians
American male jazz musicians
Branford Marsalis Quartet members
Buckshot LeFonque members
Blue Note Records artists
Sunnyside Records artists
American people of Italian descent